Glenburnie is a historic mansion in Natchez, Mississippi.

Location
It is located at 551 John R. Junkin Dr. in Natchez, Mississippi. It is next door to Elms Court.

History
The mansion was built in 1833 on land granted to Adam Lewis Bingaman (1790-1869) in 1798 by Sturges Sprague, an attorney. From 1901 to 1904, H.G. Bulky extended it in the Classical Colonial style.

It has been listed on the National Register of Historic Places since December 19, 1978.

References

Houses completed in 1833
Houses on the National Register of Historic Places in Mississippi
Houses in Natchez, Mississippi
National Register of Historic Places in Natchez, Mississippi